is a town located in Niigata Prefecture, Japan. , the town had an estimated population of 14,025 in 4715 households, and a population density of 373 persons per km².

Geography
Seirō is located in central Niigata Prefecture, sandwiched between the cities of Niigata and Shibata, with a small coastline on the Sea of Japan.

Surrounding municipalities
Niigata Prefecture
Kita-ku, Niigata
Shibata

Climate
Seirō has a Humid climate (Köppen Cfa) characterized by warm, wet summers and cold winters with heavy snowfall.  The average annual temperature in Seirō is 13.1 °C. The average annual rainfall is 1940 mm with September as the wettest month. The temperatures are highest on average in August, at around 26.3 °C, and lowest in January, at around 1.5 °C.

Demographics
Per Japanese census data, the population of Seirō has grown slightly over the past 50 years.

History
The area of present-day Seirō was part of ancient Echigo Province. After the Meiji restoration, the area was organized as part of Kitakanbara District, Niigata. The village of Seirō was established on April 1, 1889 with the creation of the modern municipalities system. It was raised to town status in August 1977.

Economy
The local economy was formerly dependent on commercial fishing, but is now dominated by industry, notably the production of precision components and food processing. The Higashi-Niigata Thermal Power Station, a large fossil-fuel thermal power station operated by Tohoku Electric, is located in Seirō. The Port of Niigata is  a major employer.

Education
Seirō has three public elementary schools and one public middle school operated by the town government. The town does not have a high school.

Transportation

Railway
 Seirō is not served by an passenger train routes.

Highway

References

External links

Official Website 

 
Towns in Niigata Prefecture
Populated coastal places in Japan